Papri Ghosh is an Indian actress who predominantly appears in Bengali and Tamil films and serials. She made her film debut in Kaalbela (2009) and now playing lead in Sun TV serial Pandavar Illam.

Career
Papri Ghosh made her debut in Goutam Ghose's Bengali film Kaalbela, released on 16 January 2009. She also had a lead role in Krodh,  directed by Shankar Ray and released on 25 December 2009.
  
She starred as Hema in the Tamil movie Touring Talkies with S. A. Chandrasekhar, Manobala, and Robo Shankar, directed by S. A. Chandrasekhar and released on 30 January 2015. She played Brishti in Beparoyaa with Surya and Rajatava Dutta, directed by Pijush Saha and released on 15 January 2016. She also starred as Gayathri in Oyee, a Tamil movie with Geethan Britto, Eesha, and Arjunan Nandhakumar, directed by Francis Markus and released on 8 April 2016. Papri played role in Bairavaa with Vijay and Keerthy Suresh directed by Barathan and released on 12 January 2017.And a guest role in sarkar with vijay and keerthy suresh

Filmography

Television 
Serials

Shows

References

External links
 
 

1990s births
Living people
Actresses in Bengali cinema
Actresses in Tamil cinema
Actresses in Telugu cinema
Indian child actresses
Indian film actresses
21st-century Indian actresses
Actresses from Mumbai